"The staff ate it later" is a caption (Telop) that is shown on screen when a dish or food appears on a Japanese TV program. This indicates that the dish or ingredients were eaten and not thrown away; however, some people question the authenticity of this statement, and others believe the display of this caption has lowered the quality of TV programs.

First appearance 
It is thought that TV stations first started showing the caption as a self-defense measure, anticipating complaints from viewers who disliked food being handled roughly on TV variety shows. It's not clear when this annotation began to be used, but according to TV producer Kenji Suga, when a performance using small watermelons was broadcast in Downtown no Gaki no Tsukai ya Arahende!! (ダウンタウンのガキの使いやあらへんで!! Dauntaun no Gaki no Tsukai ya Arahende!!, lit. "Downtown's We Aren't Errand Boys!") on Nippon TV, a viewer complained,  "Don't waste food." As a result, he says, the TV station displayed this annotation on the screen the following year.

Authenticity 
There are various theories as to whether staff actually eat the dishes and ingredients that appear in the programs.

According to AOL News in 2014, the crew on one information program testified that "It's difficult for the reporter to eat all the food provided by the restaurant, so the staff instructed the reporter not to eat it all. However, the staff ate the rest of the dish in obligation of the restaurant." In "Meshizanmai Hurusatonoaji" (Meshizanmai Taste of Hometown), published by food comic artist Raswell Hosoki and others, Eriko Miyazaki, a reporter for the cooking show, claims that the annotation is true, saying "At least on the show I'm on, the staff eats all the rest of the dishes." In January 2018, Miwa Asao, former professional beach volleyball player and TV personality, published photos on her blog of staff eating food after recording "Saturday Night! Otona na TV" (TVQ Kyushu Broadcasting). She wrote "This is a photo of the location shoot. The staff will eat the rest of the dishes.".

Hitoshi Matsumoto, a comedian and TV host, was asked by sociologist Noritoshi Furuichi about this note in 2014 at the "Wide na Show" (Fuji Television). He said, "I don't know if it's true or not. However, I've never seen the staff eating the rest of a dish." Beat Takeshi (also known as Takeshi Kitano), Japanese comedian, television presenter, actor, filmmaker, and author, stated that no one eats food that fell onto the floor of their own accord in his book "Bakaron". A commentator, Tsunehira Furuya, also stated that the dishes used in the show are not eaten by the staff later, and are thrown away after the show.

Criticism of displaying annotation 
Tetsuya Uetaki has commented on displaying the note. 
Broadcast writer Sotani states that TV programs have become more sensitive to dealing with ingredients in programs and display annotations on the screen to prevent complaints from viewers. TV producer Kenji Suga also says that the strict restrictions make TV programs unexciting.

Columnist Takashi Matsuo argues that adults, not TV shows, should teach children the importance of saving food. He also argues that if the parent feels uncomfortable about the child watching what the comedian is expressing on TV, then the parent should switch to another channel or turn off the TV instead of complaining to the TV station. Matsuo also points out the inconsistency that the "the staff ate it later" caption is not displayed even in scenes where a large number of tomatoes are thrown at the festival of Tomatina in Spain or when athletes are doing champagne fights to celebrate their victory.

Footnote

References 

Television terminology
Food and drink television
Food waste
Television controversies in Japan
Japanese entertainment terms